Jerry Smith (born April 23, 1964) is an American professional golfer. He has played on the PGA Tour and the Nationwide Tour.

Smith was born in Council Bluffs, Iowa. He played college golf at Baylor University. He turned professional in 1987.

Smith played on the Asian Tour for seven years, winning the 1998 Guam Open.

Smith played on the Nationwide Tour in 1999, 2003, and 2005. His best finishes were a pair of T-2 in 2005 at the Chattanooga Classic, which he lost in a playoff, and the Permian Basin Charity Golf Classic.

Smith played the PGA Tour from 2000 to 2002 and 2006 to 2007. His best finish was a T-3 at the 2001 National Car Rental Golf Classic Disney.

Smith has played in four U.S. Opens but never made the cut.

Smith qualified for the 2015 Champions Tour by finishing third at qualifying school in 2014.

Personal life
Smith lives in Scottsdale, Arizona. He and his wife, Jennifer (née Johnson) Smith, have two daughters, Giavanna and Olivia.

Professional wins (3)

Asian Tour wins (1)

Asian Tour playoff record (0–1)

Other wins (1)
1991 Waterloo Open Golf Classic

Champions Tour wins (1)

Playoff record
Nationwide Tour playoff record (0–1)

See also
1999 PGA Tour Qualifying School graduates
2005 Nationwide Tour graduates

References

External links

American male golfers
PGA Tour golfers
Asian Tour golfers
PGA Tour Champions golfers
Korn Ferry Tour graduates
Golfers from Iowa
Baylor Bears men's golfers
Sportspeople from Council Bluffs, Iowa
Golfers from Scottsdale, Arizona
1964 births
Living people